Malcolm Azania (born 1969), is a Kenyan-Canadian novelist, teacher, writer, and journalist. He is primarily known by his pen name, Minister Faust. In addition to writing science fiction, he is a playwright, journalist, teacher, and poet. He has also written video games. He was writer in residence at the University of Alberta, 2014-2015.

Personal life 
Born in Edmonton, Alberta, Malcolm Azania is the son of a Kenyan and a Canadian. He attended local schools and started writing from an early age, showing an interest in science fiction.

Career 
Azania's first published work was his science fiction play, The Undiscovered Country (1986), for Montreal's Creations Etc.

He is the current writer in residence at the University of Alberta. Writing in the science fiction and fantasy genres, he refers to his subgenre of writing as imhotep-hop. Imhotep-hop is an Africentric subgenre that draws inspiration from numerous ancient African civilizations and focuses on a future in which people struggle for justice.

Most of his works deal with political themes in some way, with the most notable works being the ongoing War & Mir series.

Novels

The Coyote Kings 

Azania's debut novel, The Coyote Kings, Book One: Space Age Bachelor Pad (2004), was a finalist for the Philip K. Dick award, The Locus Best First Novel Award, and The Compton-Cook Award. The novel follows Sherem, an Ethiopian savant, and Hamza and Yehat through a story filled with action, pop culture and Africentric themes.

From the Notebooks of Dr. Brain 

His second book, From the Notebooks of Dr. Brain (2007), was the winner of the Carl Brandon Society Kindred Award and the runner-up for the Philip K. Dick Prize. The story explores around six fictional super heroes in therapy and their revelations of the difficulties of being a celebrity.

The Alchemists of Kush 
The Alchemists of Kush (2011) follows the paths of two Sudanese boys as they attempt to change the world.

War & Mir 
His War and Mir series consists of two novels, War & Mir, Volume I: Ascension (2011), and War & Mir, Volume II: The Darkold (2014), with a third novel currently being written. The story centers on Taharqa Douglass, a man with a unique trait that marks him as a prime target for drafting into an interstellar war.

Video games

Mass Effect 2 DLC 

Azania co-wrote Mass Effect 2's Kasumi DLC (Downloadable Content). It was initially released on April 6, 2010 for the PC and Xbox, and released on January 18 for the PS3. The DLC introduces a new character and several new outfits, as well as an original quest line.

Gift of the Yeti 
Azania wrote BioWare's Gift of the Yeti, an app for Facebook which was released in 2009, with the intent of raising $10,000 for Childs Play, a charity that funds hospitals for children. In the game, the player controls a yeti who must take Santa's place for one year, and deliver presents to everyone while evading the police.

Darkspore 

Azania wrote maxis' Darkspore, which was released on April 26, 2011. The game involves creating an avatar and fighting across various worlds in an attempt to save the galaxy.

Stage writing and sketch comedy 
Azania's stage writing career began at 17 when he wrote the science fiction play The Undiscovered Country for Montreal's Creations Etc. His play The Wonderful World of Wangari is about the Kenyan Nobel Peace laureate Dr. Wangari Maathi. Azania also has written sketches for local television shows, the 11:02 Show and Gordon’s Big Bald Head.

Print journalism 
Azania's short stories and poems appear in a multitude of collections, and his articles have been included in numerous publications such as i09, and Adventure Rocketship: Let's all Go To the Science Fiction Disco.

Radio and television

Africentric radio 

Azania founded Africentric Radio in 1991, and continued with it until 2012. It was also called The Terrodome: Black Radio In the Hour Of Chaos and later The Terrordome: The Afrika All World News Service. During its time on the air, Africentric Radio featured many prominent political and artistic figures, including Americans Noam Chomsky and Ice-T.

HelpTV 
During the years 2007-2008, Azania was the host and associate producer for HelpTV, a Canadian national daily program.

Book TV's 3 Day Novel Contest 
Azania was the celebrity Judge on Book TV's 3 Day Novel Contest for two seasons.

Bibliography

Books 
 The Coyote Kings of the Space Age Bachelor Pad (2004) Novel
 From the Notebooks of Dr. Brain (2007) Novel
 The Alchemists of Kush (2011) Novel
 War & Mir, Volume I: Ascension (2011) Novel
 Journey To Mecha (2011) Collection
 A Bad Beat Was Brewing (2013) Collection
 E-Force (2013) Collection
 War & Mir, Volume II: The Darkold (2014) Novel

Video games
 Gift Of the Yeti (2009)
 Mass Effect 2: Kasumi – Stolen Memory (2010) Downloadable Content
 Darkspore (2011) Video Game

Stage writing 
 The Wonderful World of Wangari
 The Undiscovered Country

References

External links 

 "Minister Faust", official website
 "Minister Faust", Writer in Residence, University of Alberta
 Minister Faust, "How to Engage in Better Small Talk" (TED talk), Small Talk Blog
 

1969 births
Canadian people of Kenyan descent
Black Canadian writers
Canadian science fiction writers
Living people
Writers from Edmonton
Academic staff of the University of Alberta
Afrofuturist writers
Canadian male novelists